Philippine Standard Time (PST or PhST), also known as Philippine Time (PHT), is the official name for the time zone used in the Philippines. The country only uses a single time zone, at an offset of UTC+08:00, but has used daylight saving time for brief periods in the 20th century.

Geographic details
Philippine Standard Time is maintained by the Philippine Atmospheric, Geophysical and Astronomical Services Administration (PAGASA). The Philippines shares the same time zone with China, Taiwan, Hong Kong, Macau, Malaysia, Singapore, Western Australia, Brunei, Irkutsk, Central Indonesia, and most of Mongolia.

History
 

For 323 years, 9 months, and 2 weeks which lasted from March 16, 1521, until December 30, 1844, the Philippines had the same date as Mexico, because it had been a Spanish colony supplied and controlled via Mexico until Mexico's independence on September 27, 1821. On August 16, 1844, the Spanish Governor-General Narciso Claveria decreed that Tuesday, December 31, 1844, will be removed from the Philippine calendar. Monday, December 30, 1844, was immediately followed by Wednesday, January 1, 1845, which added 1 day or 24 hours to the local time. This meant that International Date Line moved from going west of the Philippines to go on the east side of the country.
At the time, the local mean time was used to set clocks, meaning that every place used its own local time based on its longitude because the time was measured by locally observing the sun.

Philippine Standard Time was instituted through Batas Pambansa Blg. 8 (that defined the metric system), approved on December 2, 1978, and implemented on January 1, 1983. The Philippines is one of the few countries to officially and almost exclusively use the 12-hour clock in non-military situations.

Time in the Philippines

Use of daylight saving time

Since 1990, the Philippines has not observed daylight saving time, although it was in use for short periods during the presidency of Manuel L. Quezon in 1936–1937, Ramon Magsaysay in 1954, Ferdinand Marcos in 1978, and Corazon Aquino in 1990.

Juan Time
Television and radio stations in the Philippines display the time, but varied from a few seconds to minutes. In September 2011, the Department of Science and Technology proposed to synchronize time nationwide in an effort to discourage tardiness. PAGASA installed a rubidium atomic clock, a GPS receiver, a time interval counter, a distribution amplifier and a computer to help calculate the time difference with every satellite within its antenna's field of view.

On May 15, 2013, President Benigno Aquino III signed Republic Act No. 10535, better known as "The Philippine Standard Time (PST) Act" as the latest step of implementing the Juan Time. Since June 1, 2013, all government offices and media networks are required to synchronise their timepieces with PAGASA's rubidium atomic clock. In addition, the first week of January will be regularly observed as National Time Consciousness Week.

IANA time zone database
The IANA time zone database contains one zone for the Philippines in the file zone.tab, named Asia/Manila

Date and time format

Date
Standard: March 22, 2022 
Formal (Public Documents): the 22nd day of March 2022 or 22 March 2022 
Filipino: ika-22 ng Marso, 2022 or 22 Marso 2022 
Passport: 22 03 2022

Time
Standard: 12-hour clock
Military/Scouting: US Military Time
Public Transport and Marathon events: 24-hour clock
Common Spoken Language
Tagalized Spanish terminology (original Spanish spelling in parentheses; AM radio stations and everyday conversation)
8:41 – Alas otso kuwarenta y uno (A las ocho cuarenta y uno)
5:30 – Alas singko y medya (A las cinco y media)
3:00 – Alas tres (A las tres; en punto, literally meaning "on the dot", may be added to signify "o'Clock".)
English (Business, Legal and others)
8:41 PM – Eight forty-one PM
5:30 AM – Five Thirty AM
3:00 PM – Three O'Clock or Three PM
12:00 PM – Twelve Midday or Twelve Noon – Twelve PM is seldom used as it might be confused with 12 Midnight
12:00 AM – Twelve Midnight – Twelve AM is seldom used as it might be confused with 12 Noon
Tagalog and Filipino
Starts with Spanish-derived (original spelling in parentheses) and ends with Tagalog – Umaga starts at 5:00 AM and ends 11:59 AM. Tanghalì is noon. Hapon starts at 1:00 PM and ends 5:59 PM. Gabí starts at 6:00 PM and ends 12:00 AM which is Hatinggabi. Madalíng Araw starts at 12:01 AM and ends 4:59 AM. Except in very formal situations, Filipinos rarely use the vernacular numbers in telling time.

8:41 P.M. – Alas otso kuwarenta y uno (A las ocho cuarenta y uno) ng gabí or Apatnapú't-isá(ng minuto) makalipas ng ikawaló ng gabí or (ika)waló at apatnapú't-isá (na) ng gabi
5:30 A.M. – Alas singko y medya (A las cinco y media) ng umaga or Tatlumpû(ng minuto) makalipas ng ikalimá ng umaga or Kalahati makalipas ng ikalimá ng umaga or (ika)limá at kalaháti ng umaga or (ika)limá at tatlumpû(ng minuto) (na) ng umaga
3:00 P.M. – Alas tres (A las tres) ng hapon o Ikatló ng hapon
12:00 P.M. – Alas dose (A las doce) ng tanghalì o Ikalabíndalawá ng tanghalì
12:00 A.M. – Alas dose (A las doce) ng hatinggabi o Ikalabíndalawá ng hatinggabí
2:00 A.M. – Alas dos ng madalíng araw (A las dos) o Ikalawá ng madalíng araw

Notes

References

External links
 Official time in the Philippines
 World Time Zone Abbreviations, Description and UTC Offset
 Time in the Philippines Now

 Standard Time
Time in Southeast Asia